Simon Jonathan Dawkins (born 1 December 1987) is a professional footballer who plays as an attacking midfielder or winger for USL Championship side Monterey Bay FC. Born in England, he represented the Jamaica national team.

Club career

Tottenham Hotspur
Dawkins joined the Tottenham Hotspur academy in 2004 and featured regularly in the reserves. He featured in the first team matchday squad once, as an unused sub under Martin Jol for a UEFA Cup game against Anorthosis Famagusta, but was unable to break through into the starting line ups. On 1 June 2009, Dawkins was released from his Tottenham Hotspur contract and then failed a medical at RC Strasbourg.

Leyton Orient (loan)
He joined Leyton Orient on loan before the start of the 2008–09 season. His first team debut was delayed after picking up an ankle injury in a friendly match, coincidentally, against parent club Tottenham. He made his first league appearance on 16 August 2008, coming on as a substitute against Peterborough United, and made his cup debut in the Football League Trophy on 2 September where they beat Southend United 4–2. His loan period ended on 3 January 2009.

Return to Tottenham Hotspur
Dawkins later returned to Tottenham on a non-contract basis while recovering from injury. A contract was dependent upon his proven fitness at start of the 2010–11 season.

In August 2010, Dawkins went on trial with Celtic later deciding to continue to train with Tottenham, scoring in a training friendly against Milton Keynes Dons on 8 December.

On 14 March 2011, Dawkins was rewarded with a contract by Tottenham Hotspur after impressing back at the club on trial, with his contract set to run until June 2013.

San Jose Earthquakes (loan)
Dawkins then signed for the San Jose Earthquakes on loan. He made his debut for the Earthquakes on 19 March in their first game of the 2011 MLS season, a 1–0 loss to Real Salt Lake. He scored his first goal for his new club on 2 April in a 2–2 draw with Seattle Sounders. In January 2012 there was interest from Steve McClaren's FC Twente but a loan deal could not be finalised. Dawkins appeared in a Spurs matchday squad for the first time in over four years when he was an unused substitute for an FA Cup tie against Stevenage.

Aston Villa (loan)
On the final day of the January 2013 transfer window, Dawkins signed on loan with Premier League club Aston Villa for the remainder of the 2012–13 season. On 10 February 2013, at the age of 25, he made his Premier League debut in a match against West Ham United, which Villa won 2–1.

Derby County
On 14 October 2013, Dawkins joined Championship side Derby County. It was announced on 18 October 2013 that Dawkins would be extending his stay with the Rams by agreeing to a 93-day emergency loan. Dawkins made his first appearance for Derby on 19 October 2013, coming on as a replacement for Mason Bennett at the beginning of the second half. After a series of impressive performances for Derby, Head Coach Steve McClaren expressed his interest in signing Dawkins permanently in the January transfer window. A deal was reached with Tottenham and they agreed a fee on 3 January 2014, with Dawkins agreeing to a -year deal. He thus became manager Steve McClaren's first permanent signing for Derby.

San Jose Earthquakes
On 6 January 2016, Dawkins joined Major League Soccer side San Jose Earthquakes for an undisclosed fee.

On 16 February 2018, Dawkins and San Jose agreed to mutually terminate his contract with the club. Minnesota United FC claimed Dawkins on waivers shortly after the termination of his contract with San Jose. However, Dawkins was released a week later before the start of the season.

Ipswich Town
Following a trial in December 2018, Dawkins signed for Ipswich Town in January 2019 on a short-term deal, with the option of an additional 12 months. He was released at the end of the 2018–19 season after making just 2 substitute appearances for the club.

Monterey Bay 
After a nearly three year absence from club football, Dawkins was announced as a signing for USL Championship expansion side Monterey Bay FC on 15 March 2022. Dawkins had previously played under manager Frank Yallop during his initial loan spell with the San Jose Earthquakes, and assistant manager Ramiro Corrales was also his teammate at the time. On 23 July 2022, Dawkins scored his first goal for Monterey Bay during a 2-0 victory over New York Red Bulls II.

International career
Dawkins made his international debut for Jamaica on 26 May 2014 against Serbia at the Red Bull Arena in New Jersey. He scored his first goal for Jamaica in a 2–2 draw with Egypt on 4 June 2014 at Leyton Orient. Dawkins scored a last minute winner to see Jamaica through to the next round of qualifying stages with a spectacular volley against Nicaragua.

Career statistics

Club

International

International goals
As of match played 8 September 2015. Scores and results list Jamaica's goal tally first, "score" column indicates score after each Dawkins goal.

Honours

Club
San Jose Earthquakes
 Major League Soccer Supporters' Shield: 2012
 Major League Soccer Western Conference Regular Season Championship: 2012

International
Jamaica
Caribbean Cup: 2014
CONCACAF Gold Cup runner-up: 2015

References

External links
 
 

1987 births
Living people
English footballers
English expatriate footballers
English people of Jamaican descent
Jamaican footballers
Jamaican expatriate footballers
Jamaica international footballers
Tottenham Hotspur F.C. players
Leyton Orient F.C. players
San Jose Earthquakes players
Aston Villa F.C. players
English Football League players
Derby County F.C. players
Ipswich Town F.C. players
Major League Soccer players
Premier League players
Expatriate soccer players in the United States
Footballers from Greater London
Black British sportspeople
2014 Caribbean Cup players
2015 Copa América players
2015 CONCACAF Gold Cup players
Association football forwards
Association football midfielders
Designated Players (MLS)
English expatriate sportspeople in the United States
Monterey Bay FC players